Limulus is a genus of horseshoe crab, with one extant species, the Atlantic horseshoe crab (Limulus polyphemus).  One fossil species is currently assigned to the genus though several other species have been named, which have since been assigned to other genera.

Currently valid species include:
Limulus polyphemus (Linnaeus, 1758)
Limulus coffini† Reeside & Harris, 1952- Pierre Shale, United States, Late Cretaceous (Maastrichtian)

Doubtful species include:
 Limulus nathorsti† Jackson, 1906- Jurassic, Sweden

Tentative species:
"Limulus" decheni† Zinken, 1862- Paleogene, Germany (considered by some intermediate between Limulus and Tachypleus)

References

Xiphosura
Prehistoric chelicerates
Extant Triassic first appearances